The Butturacci is a coastal stream in the department of Corse-du-Sud, Corsica, France.

Course

It drains the valley between the hills to the east and southeast of Coti Chiavari and the hills west of Tassinca.Paradis 
It rises in the commune of Cognocoli-Monticchi.
It flows southeast, forming the boundary between the communes of Serra-di-Ferro and Coti-Chiavari.
It enters the Baie de Cupabia at Cupabia beach.

At the beach it receives the  Vesco Vecchio stream, which is dry much of the year. In wet winters the Butturacci cuts across the sandy cordon and beach.
When the flow decreases, usually starting in March, the end of its course becomes more or less parallel to the sandy strip, flowing to the southeast before entering the sea.

The Köppen climate classification is Csb : Warm-summer Mediterranean climate.

Hydrology

The flow of the stream was measured from 1979 to 1994 at the Pont de Gradello station in Coti-Chiavari.

Tributaries
The following streams (ruisseaux) are tributaries of the Ruisseau Butturacci:
Ruisseau Vesco Vecchio
Ruisseau Tenera

Notes

Sources

Rivers of Corse-du-Sud
Rivers of France
Coastal basins of the Mediterranean Sea in Corsica